The Populist Party was a left-wing political party in Northern Cyprus between 1975 and 1981.

History
The party was established in 1975 by Alper Orhon, and won two seats in the 1976 elections. However, the following year one of its two MPs defected to the Communal Liberation Party. In 1981 it merged into the Democratic People's Party.

Ideology
The party had social democratic principles, and was considered to be a Cypriot version of the Republican People's Party in Turkey. It was critical of the National Unity Party government's handling of economic affairs, particularly the dependence on Turkey for economic development. It supported government-run enterprises and the participation of workers in planning.

References

Defunct political parties in Northern Cyprus
Political parties established in 1975
Political parties disestablished in 1981
1975 establishments in Cyprus
Kemalist political parties